  
Scamblesby is a village and civil parish in the East Lindsey district from Lincolnshire, England.

History
In 1185, Roger de Maletoth gave a bovate, around 20 acres of land, at Scamblesby, to the Knights Templar.

In 1507, the prebend of Scamblesby was held by Polydore Vergil, an Italian historian and priest, who had moved to England in 1502. Vergil held the prebend until 1513 but lived mainly in London.

In 1672, Herbert Thorndike, Canon of Westminster Abbey, left the 'lands and tenements' he owned in Scamblesby, to be held in trust, to provide a 'perpetual vicarage' for the local church.

The village Anglican parish church is dedicated to St Martin. It was partially rebuilt in the 1890s and seats around 100.

Education
In 2007 Scamblesby Church of England Primary School achieved examination grades higher than the local and the national average. Its 2012 Ofsted inspection judgements rated the school as Grade 2 (good) overall. The school has a website found here

References

External links 

 Scamblesby Village website
 East Lindsey District Council website
 Scamblesby Church of England Primary School web site

Villages in Lincolnshire
Civil parishes in Lincolnshire
East Lindsey District